In mathematics, Grönwall's inequality (also called Grönwall's lemma or the Grönwall–Bellman inequality) allows one to bound a function that is known to satisfy a certain differential or integral inequality by the solution of the corresponding differential or integral equation. There are two forms of the lemma, a differential form and an integral form. For the latter there are several variants.

Grönwall's inequality is an important tool to obtain various estimates in the theory of ordinary and stochastic differential equations. In particular, it provides a comparison theorem that can be used to prove uniqueness of a solution to the initial value problem; see the Picard–Lindelöf theorem.

It is named for Thomas Hakon Grönwall (1877–1932). Grönwall is the Swedish spelling of his name, but he spelled his name as Gronwall in his scientific publications after emigrating to the United States.

Richard Bellman proved a slightly more general integral form in 1943.

A nonlinear generalization of the Grönwall–Bellman inequality is known as Bihari–LaSalle inequality. Other variants and generalizations can be found in Pachpatte, B.G. (1998).

Differential form 

then  is bounded by the solution of the corresponding differential equation :

for all .

Remark: There are no assumptions on the signs of the functions  and .

Proof 

Define the function

Note that  satisfies

By the quotient rule

Thus the derivative of the function  is non-positive and the function is bounded above by its value at the initial point  of the interval :

which is Grönwall's inequality.

Integral form for continuous functions 
Let ,  and  be real-valued functions defined on .
 (a) If  is non-negative and if  satisfies the integral inequality

then

 (b) If, in addition, the function  is non-decreasing, then

Remarks:
 There are no assumptions on the signs of the functions  and .

Proof 
(a) Define

Using the product rule, the chain rule, the derivative of the exponential function and the fundamental theorem of calculus, we obtain for the derivative

where we used the assumed integral inequality for the upper estimate. Since  and the exponential are non-negative, this gives an upper estimate for the derivative of .

Substituting this result into the assumed integral inequality gives Grönwall's inequality.

(b) If the function  is non-decreasing, then part (a), the fact , and the fundamental theorem of calculus imply that

Integral form with locally finite measures 
Let  and  be measurable functions defined on  and let  be a continuous non-negative measure on the Borel σ-algebra of  satisfying  for all  (this is certainly satisfied when  is a locally finite measure).

and that  satisfies the integral inequality

If, in addition,
 the function  is non-negative or

 

then  satisfies Grönwall's inequality

for all , where  denotes to open interval .

Remarks
 The integral in Grönwall's inequality is allowed to give the value infinity.
Compared to the one given below, their proof does not discuss the behaviour of the remainder .

Special cases
 If the measure  has a density  with respect to  Lebesgue measure, then Grönwall's inequality can be rewritten as

 

 
 If, in addition, the non-negative function  is non-decreasing, then

Outline of proof 
The proof is divided into three steps. The idea is to substitute the assumed integral inequality into itself  times. This is done in Claim 1 using mathematical induction. In Claim 2 we rewrite the measure of a simplex in a convenient form, using the permutation invariance of product measures. In the third step we pass to the limit  to infinity to derive the desired variant of Grönwall's inequality.

Detailed proof

Claim 1: Iterating the inequality
For every natural number  including zero,

with remainder

where

is an -dimensional simplex and

Proof of Claim 1
We use mathematical induction. For  this is just the assumed integral inequality, because the empty sum is defined as zero.

Inserting the assumed integral inequality for the function  into the remainder gives

with

Using the Fubini–Tonelli theorem to interchange the two integrals, we obtain

Claim 2: Measure of the simplex
For every natural number  including zero and all  in 

Proof of Claim 2
For , the claim is true by our definitions. Therefore, consider  in the following.

Let  denote the set of all permutations of the indices in }. For every permutation  define

These sets are disjoint for different permutations and

Therefore,

Then, for different indices }, the set

Since

the claimed equality follows.

Proof of Grönwall's inequality
For every natural number , Claim 2 implies for the remainder of Claim 1 that

By assumption we have . Hence, the integrability assumption on  implies that

Claim 2 and the series representation of the exponential function imply the estimate

for all  in . If the function  is non-negative, then it suffices to insert these results into Claim 1 to derive the above variant of Grönwall's inequality for the function .

and the integrability of the function  permits to use the dominated convergence theorem to derive Grönwall's inequality.

References

See also
 Stochastic Gronwall inequality
 Logarithmic norm, for a version of Gronwall's lemma that gives upper and lower bounds to the norm of the state transition matrix.
 Halanay inequality. A similar inequality to Gronwall's lemma that is used for differential equations with delay.

Lemmas in analysis
Ordinary differential equations
Stochastic differential equations
Articles containing proofs
Probabilistic inequalities